Leonhard Tietz (March 3 1849 - November 14 1914) was a German department store entrepreneur and art collector of Jewish origin.

Biography
Born in Birnbaum an der Warthe, Province of Posen, Prussia (today Międzychód, Poland), Leonhard Tietz was the brother of Oskar Tietz and a founding member of the Tietz Department store dynasty. On 14 August 1879, he opened his first department store in Stralsund, with the idea of selling high-quality products at fixed prices for cash. He was the first to introduce a money-back guarantee. In 1891, a shop was opened in Cologne.

In 1905, his enterprise was transformed into a joint stock company.

Art collector 
Tietz owned an art collection which included paintings by Vincent van Gogh and Paul Cézanne. In 1912 he lent a self portrait by van Gogh and a still-life by Cézanne ("Stilleben, Früchte mit Glas und Porsellanschale") to the famous Sonderbund Exhibition in Cologne (Internationale Kunstausstellung des Sonderbundes Westdeutscher Kunstfreunde und Künstler zu Cöln).

Legacy and loss 
After Tietz's death, his son Alfred Leonhard Tietz led the Tietz firm. In 1933, the Nazi Party came to power in Germany and Jewish businesses were targeted.  

The Nazi policy of racial discrimination and anti-semitic harassment of Jewish-managed firms hurt the Tietzs' department store and other businesses. The business was renamed Westdeutsche Kaufhof AG. In an "Aryanisation" (the obligatory transfer of Jewish businesses to non-Jewish owners), the Tietz family was forced to sell their shares under market value. They fled Nazi Germany. After the Allied victory, they received some compensation estimated at 5 million DM.

Today, the department store chain Galeria Kaufhof is the direct descendant of the tiny shop opened in 1879.

Literature 
Discrimination, Managers, and Firm Performance: Evidence from “Aryanizations” in Nazi Germany Kilian Huber, Volker Lindenthal, and Fabian Waldinger NOVEMBER 2020

See also 
Aryanization

The Holocaust

Department stores

Tietz Department Store (Elberfeld)

References

External links

 

1849 births
1914 deaths
19th-century German Jews
German economists
German businesspeople in retailing
19th-century German businesspeople
20th-century German businesspeople
People from the Province of Posen
Businesspeople from Mecklenburg-Western Pomerania
People from Międzychód